The Zacharias Sexual Abuse Center  is a non-profit rape crisis center operating in Gurnee, Illinois, and was incorporated in 1983.  The center is a member organization of the Illinois Coalition Against Sexual Assault (ICASA), which provides funding and statewide standards for 33 rape crisis centers throughout Illinois.

Services
The Zacharias Center offers three programs directly targeted at sexual abuse victims, a 24 Hour Hotline (847-872-7799), counseling services, and advocacy services, which includes medical and legal assistance on behalf of the survivor and significant others.

In addition, Sexual Assault Prevention-Education classes are delivered onsite to school children, their parents, school administrators and teachers, and professional training is offered to police, emergency room staff, social workers, court personnel and other groups working with survivors of sexual abuse and assault.

Building
In 1997, the Zacharias Center opened a new building to house operations. The building concept represents the theoretical and architectural concept of "The Emotional Content of the Physical Space".

Input from sexual abuse survivors was used in order to create an environment which would be interpreted by clients as safe. The building incorporates open spaces, multiple and large windows allowing for extra light, high ceilings, soft-tone colors, outdoor garden areas and comfortable furniture.

History
In early 1977, women activists from nine community-based rape crisis centers in Illinois gathered to provide mutual support. These activists named their group the Illinois Coalition of Women Against Rape (ICWAR). In 1984 the name of ICWAR was changed to the Illinois Coalition Against Sexual Assault (ICASA) to reflect the inclusion of men as victims of sexual assault.

In August 1981 the Lake County Health Department formed a Rape Victim Advocacy Task Force to study the need for rape victim advocacy services in Lake County, Illinois. Their findings documented that services to rape victims in Lake County, Illinois were inadequate and fragmented. The first funding for sexual assault crisis centers, $148,889, was distributed by ICWAR to 12 centers in 1982. Later that year, four more centers were funded. Subsequent funds enabled centers to hire advocates, counselors and educators.

In 1983, the Zacharias Center was accepted as a member of ICASA and granted funding support. In 1984, 24 hour Hotline and Medical Advocacy service began, as well as Community Education and Professional Training Programs. In 1985, the Center received a grant from the Violent Crime Victims Assistance Fund and was accepted as a member of United Way of Lake County.

Supporters 
Marilyn Van Derbur, a former Miss America and incest survivor, became a supporter of the Zacharias Center. She has received many awards including recognition for "Exceptional Achievement in Public Service from the Secretary of Health and Human Services, Washington D.C."

See also
 List of anti-sexual assault organizations in the United States
 Rape, Abuse & Incest National Network (National Sexual Assault Hotline at 1-800-656-HOPE)
 Rape
 Rape kit
 Sexual assault

References

External links
 White House Website Proclamation

Charities based in Illinois
Sexual abuse advocacy and support groups